The Valdese News was  a newspaper based in Valdese, North Carolina covering Burke County.  The newspaper was published from 1938 through 1950.

References

Defunct newspapers published in North Carolina
Burke County, North Carolina
1938 establishments in North Carolina
1950 disestablishments in North Carolina